Keweenaw Bay is an arm of Lake Superior in North America. It is located adjacent to the Upper Peninsula of the U.S. state of Michigan, to the southeast of the Keweenaw Peninsula. Keweenaw Bay is 22 miles long and 12 miles wide at the mouth. The head of the bay sits within the reservation of the Keweenaw Bay Indian Community. It is also the name of a small community near the bay.

Communites near Keweenaw Bay include Aura,  Assinins, Baraga, Keweenaw Bay, L'Anse, Pequaming, Zeba.

Indian Trails bus lines operates daily intercity service between Hancock, Michigan and Milwaukee, Wisconsin with a stop in the Keweenaw Bay at Carla's Lakeshore Motel.

References

External links

Bodies of water of Baraga County, Michigan
Bays of Michigan
Bodies of water of Houghton County, Michigan
Bays of Lake Superior